"Count the Ways" is a song co-written and recorded by Canadian country artist Jade Eagleson. He wrote the track with Travis Wood, and the track's producers Todd Clark and Gavin Slate.  It was the second single from Eagleson's debut studio album Jade Eagleson.

Commercial performance
"Count the Ways" reached a peak of number four on the Billboard Canada Country chart for the week of July 20, 2019, marking Eagleson's second consecutive top ten hit after debuting with "Got Your Name on It" in 2018. It has been certified Gold by Music Canada.

Music video
The official music video for "Count the Ways" premiered on April 24, 2019, and was directed by Ben Knechtel. It was shot in both Toronto, Ontario and at The Golden Wheel in Peterborough, Ontario, a spot in which Eagleson previously played for the kitchen staff at early in his music career.

Credits and personnel
Credits adapted from Jade Eagleson CD booklet.

 Jade Eagleson – lead vocals
 Todd Clark — backing vocals, guitar, keyboard, drums, programming, production, engineering
 Matty Green — mixing
 Tony Lucido — bass guitar
 Gavin Slate — backing vocals, guitar, programming, production
 Derek Wells — guitar
 Travis Wood — guitar

Charts

Certifications

References

2019 songs
2019 singles
Jade Eagleson songs
Universal Music Canada singles
Songs written by Jade Eagleson
Songs written by Todd Clark
Songs written by Gavin Slate
Songs written by Travis Wood (songwriter)
Song recordings produced by Todd Clark
Song recordings produced by Gavin Slate